ChaHα8 (also written ChaHa8 when Greek letters are unavailable) is a brown dwarf 522 light years from Earth discovered in 2000. It was found in 2007 to have a low-mass substellar companion in orbit around it. The companion has a mass of 25–31 Jupiter masses and orbits with a period of 5.2 years and an eccentricity of 0.59.

References

External links
 Video of the radial velocity orbit of the brown dwarf binary ChaHα8

Brown dwarfs
Chamaeleon (constellation)